Red Baron is an arcade video game developed by Atari, Inc. and released in 1980.  A first-person flight simulator game, the player takes the role of a World War I ace in a biplane fighting on the side of the Allies. The game is named after the nickname of Manfred von Richthofen, German flying ace. The game uses the same monochrome vector graphics and similar hardware as Atari's own Battlezone; both were developed at the same time. Like Battlezone, the player is presented with a first-person view of the action. Both Battlezone and Red Baron use additional hardware, an "Auxiliary" board, to perform the mathematical computations required for simulating a 3D environment.

Gameplay

The game is divided up into rounds. Most rounds are divided into air combat (shooting from one to three airplanes in formation) and ground combat (two zeppelins and multiple ground targets). While the game does not feature accurate flight physics (the plane cannot be crashed directly into the ground, for instance), the vector-rendered mountain ranges serve as solid objects and flying into or through them causes the player to crash and lose one life. The mountain ranges do not impede attacks, either from the player or the enemies, and can be shot through. Enemies include: formations of enemy biplanes, zeppelins, pillboxes, turrets, and enemy buildings.

Red Baron adjusts its own game difficulty by maintaining a consistent average game time from the last 32 games played. The NVRAM stores top three scores as well as average game times. In other words, this game has "adaptive difficulty". The goal of this feature was to adapt to the skill level of the typical player at that location and prevent excessive game times.

The upright versions of Battlezone (also released in 1980) and Red Baron share the same cabinet. In Battlezone, the player looks through a window that was shaped like a tank periscope. Side-view windows were available on both sides for people not playing the game to watch the action. Battlezone utilizes a two-way mirror to superimpose the monitor display (mounted horizontally) on a tank "interior" background. Although Red Baron uses the same cabinet as Battlezone, no mirror is used and the monitor is mounted vertically, with the player viewing the display directly.

Battlezone and Red Baron both used the same "Analog Vector Generator" (AVG) circuit boards and by switching the PROM's they could be interchanged (with very minor jumper additions). Red Baron and Battlezone use different auxiliary boards which are not interchangeable.

Reception
Electronic Games magazine reported that Red Baron was not successful in arcades despite "gorgeous quadra-scan graphics and magnificent audio frills", and expressed hope that "this marvelous flight simulator with a combat theme will re-emerge in home format some day".

Legacy
While playing Red Baron in 1982, Bill Stealey and Sid Meier decided to create what became MicroProse's first game, Hellcat Ace. The company later obtained the unit they had played as a memento.

Red Baron was released as part of the Atari: 80 Classic Games in One! compilation for Microsoft Windows, and later on the Xbox and PlayStation 2 in Atari Anthology. This version included parts of the cabinet art surrounding the game screen. The game is also available on Atari Greatest Hits Volume 2 for the DS. The arcade version of “Red Baron” it’s also available on the AtGames Legends Ultimate Arcade Cabinet.

References

External links

Red Baron at the Arcade History database

1980 video games
Arcade video games
Arcade-only video games
Atari arcade games
Flight simulation video games
Shoot 'em ups
Vector arcade video games
Video games developed in the United States
World War I video games

de:Red Baron